Hoadley is a hamlet in central Alberta, Canada within Ponoka County.

History 
The community name was established as a watering stop on the now defunct Lacombe and Blindman Valley Electric Railway –built in 1917–19. It was named after George Hoadley Member of the Legislative Assembly of Alberta from 1909 to 1930.

Demographics 
Hoadley recorded a population of 9 in the 1991 Census of Population conducted by Statistics Canada.

See also 
List of communities in Alberta
List of hamlets in Alberta

References 

Hamlets in Alberta
Ponoka County